Dr. Leite Lopes State Airport  is the airport serving Ribeirão Preto, Brazil.

It is operated by Rede Voa.

History
Dr. Leite Lopes State Airport was opened on April 2, 1939, and soon after, in 1940, the runway was extended for the first time.

In 1996 the whole airport complex received its major renovation in which the runway and adjoining taxiway were extended from 1,800m to 2,100m and a new larger apron was built.

In 2006 the width of the runway was enlarged to 45m and finally in July 2010 the renovation and enlargement of the terminal building was completed.

On July 15, 2021 the concession of the airport was auctioned to Rede Voa under the name Consórcio Voa NW e Voa SE. The airport was previously operated by DAESP.

Airlines and destinations

Access

See also

List of airports in Brazil

References

External links

Airports in São Paulo (state)
Airports established in 1939